Casmaria atlantica is a species of large sea snail, a marine gastropod mollusk in the family Cassidae, the helmet snails and bonnet snails.

Description 
The maximum recorded shell length is 45 mm.

Habitat 
The minimum recorded depth for this species is 7 m; the maximum recorded depth is 30 m.

References

Cassidae
Molluscs of the Atlantic Ocean
Gastropods described in 1944
Taxa named by William J. Clench